Clinidium mareki is a species of ground beetle in the subfamily Rhysodinae. It was described by Oldřich Hovorka in 1997. It is known from the northern slope of Mount Corazón in Ecuador and named after its collector, Jaroslav Marek.

Clinidium mareki measure  in length.

References

Clinidium
Beetles of South America
Invertebrates of Ecuador
Endemic fauna of Ecuador
Beetles described in 1997